Arash is a mythological archer in Iranian legend and folklore

Arash may also refer to:

 Arash (name), a common Iranian name, including people with that name
 Arash Mahal, a city in Azerbaijan now named Agdash
 Arash Motor Company, a sports car manufacturer based in England.
 Arash (Tanzanian ward), a ward in Tanzania
 Arash (sniper rifle), a rifle developed by Iran
 Arash (singer) (born 1977), Iranian-Swedish singer, entertainer and producer
 Arash (album), 2005
 Arash (radar), an Iranian radar system
 Arash (rocket), an Iranian artillery rocket
 Arash gas field, Iranian natural gas field 
 Arash Sultanate, a feudal fiefdom that existed between 1747 and 1795 in Transcaucasus